Marcheta P. Evans (born July 10, 1959) is an American professor, counselor and academic administrator. She is currently the 17th President of Bloomfield College in Bloomfield, New Jersey, the state’s only four-year Predominantly Black Institution (PBI), Hispanic Serving Institution (HSI) and Minority Serving Institution (MSI). She was the first woman and first African American to hold the position. She is currently the only woman of color serving as president of a four-year institution of higher education in New Jersey.

Prior to Bloomfield College, she was the Provost and Vice President for Academic Affairs at Our Lady of the Lake University (OLLU). Evans also served as Vice President for Academic Affairs, Dean at OLLU and Associate Dean and Department Chair at University of Texas at San Antonio.

Evans is a past president and fellow of The American Counseling Association and past president of the Association for Creativity in Counseling.

References 

1959 births
Living people
American academic administrators
Bloomfield College